The 1998 Peach Bowl, part of the 1997 bowl game season, featured the Clemson Tigers and the Auburn Tigers.

Auburn overcame a 17–6 deficit, largely caused by three blocked punts, entering the fourth quarter to score 15 unanswered points, posting a 21–17 victory. Auburn quarterback Dameyune Craig threw a touchdown pass to Karsten Bailey for the first of three scores in the final frame. Then Rusty Williams gave Auburn the lead with a seven-yard touchdown run before Jaret Holmes booted the final field goal, one of his three successful kicks in the game.

See also
 Auburn–Clemson football rivalry

References

Peach Bowl
Peach Bowl
Clemson Tigers football bowl games
Auburn Tigers football bowl games
January 1998 sports events in the United States
Bull
1998 in Atlanta